Ronald Garland (28 July 1931 – 4 April 1989) was an English professional footballer who played as a centre forward. He played in the Football League for Oldham Athletic.

Garland played for South Bank St Peters before joining Oldham Athletic. He scored 3 times in 9 games, including a goal in the 3–2 win away to Hartlepool United in September 1955, before leaving to join Mossley. He scored 20 times in 47 games for Mossley, leaving to join Stalybridge Celtic.

References

1931 births
1989 deaths
Footballers from Middlesbrough
English footballers
Association football forwards
South Bank St Peters F.C. players
Oldham Athletic A.F.C. players
Mossley A.F.C. players
Stalybridge Celtic F.C. players
English Football League players